Henri-Alfred Darjou, a French painter and draughtsman, born in Paris in 1832, was the son of Victor Darjou, a portrait painter of some ability. He studied under his father and under Léon Cogniet, and exhibited first at the Salon of 1853, from which time onwards he almost every year sent pictures which were for the most part of genre subjects. The paintings of Darjou have, however, done less for his reputation than the numerous designs which he made for the 'Illustration' and the 'Monde illustré.' He was also the designer of the front cover of the 1867-book 'Les Reves et les Moyens de les Diriger: Observations Pratiques' by Marquis d'Hervey de Saint-Denys. He died in Paris in 1874.

References
 

Blanken, C.M. den & Meijer, E.J.G.:An historical view of ‘Dreams and the Ways to Direct Them; Practical Observations’ by
Marie-Jean-Léon Lecoq, le Marquis d’Hervey-Saint-Denys. Lucidity, 10 (1&2) pg. 311–323; 1991.

External links
 Works by Alfred Darjou at HeidICON
 

1832 births
1874 deaths
19th-century French painters
French male painters
Painters from Paris
French draughtsmen
19th-century French male artists